Block Out DVD is the self-titled DVD release by the Serbian alternative rock band Block Out. The DVD, featuring the December 23, 2005 Dom Omladine live recording and all the promotional videos the band recorded throughout their career, was released by Multimedia records in 2007.

Track listing

Live at Dom Omladine Belgrade, December 23, 2005 
All tracks written by Nikola Vranjković.
 "Veži me"
 "Čarobni akord"
 "Majdan"
 "Deponija"
 "Tata Brada"
 "Trenje"
 "Bedem"
 "Nedostupna polja"
 "Najduži je poslednji sat"
 "Protiv sebe"
 "Težak slučaj pakla"
 "Dan koji nikad nije došao"
 "Kad hodam"
 "SDSS" / "GSZ"
 "Tri korne penal"

Videos 
All tracks written by Nikola Vranjković. Directed By Milutin Jovančić except where noted.
 "Neki moji drugovi" (directed by Brana Šouc; edited by Marija Tešić, Zoran Lazarević)
 "Devojko mala"
 "Trenje"
 "Sekira" (edited by Predrag Novković)
 "Manastir" (directed by Milan Nikolić)
 "Nedostupna polja" (directed by Milorad Milinković, Milutin Jovančić)
 "Beltaine" (directed by Milan Nikolić, Milutin Jovančić)
 "Protiv sebe" (director of photography Dušan Vučković; edited by Predrag Novković)
 "Soba"
 "San koji srećan sanjaš sam"
 "Zvezdane staze"
 "Tata Brada"
 "Ako imaš s kim i gde"
 "Majdan" (director of photography Bojan Dmitrašinović, Milan Kilibarda; edited by Milutin Jovančić)
 "Nevremena" (directed by Bojan Dmitrašinović)

Personnel 
 Aleksandar Balać (bass, vocals)
 Miljko Radonjić (drums)
 Dejan Hasečić (guitar, synthesizer)
 Nikola Vranjković (guitar, vocals, producer, lyrics by, music by, mixed by)
 Milutin Jovančić (vocals, artwork by [design], edited by)

Additional personnel 
 Ljuba Pejić (engineer [sound])
 Aleksandar Zec (director of photography)
 Bojan Dmitrašinović (director of photography)
 Ivan Pecikoza (director of photography)
 Marko Petrović (director of photography)
 Milan Kilibarda (director of photography)
 Milenko Petković (director of photography)
 Marko Nježić (producer, mixed by)
 Sreten Milojević (recorded by)

External links 
 Block Out DVD at Discogs
 DVD review at Popboks 

Block Out (band) video albums
2007 video albums
2007 compilation albums
2007 live albums
Live video albums
Music video compilation albums